Marcel Gerbidon (1868–1933) was a French playwright and screenwriter. He collaborated frequently with Paul Armont. A number of his plays have been adapted into films such as the 1958 film School for Coquettes.

Selected plays
 School for Coquettes (1918)

Filmography
Le Porion, directed by Georges Champavert (France, 1921, based on the play Le Porion)
The Hotel Mouse, directed by Fred Paul (UK, 1923, based on the play Souris d'hôtel) 
The French Doll, directed by Robert Z. Leonard (1923, based on the play Jeunes filles de palaces)
The Goldfish, directed by Jerome Storm (1924, based on the play School for Coquettes)
A Son from America, directed by Henri Fescourt (France, 1925, based on the play Un fils d'Amérique) 
Souris d'hôtel, directed by Adelqui Migliar (France, 1929, based on the play Souris d'hôtel) 
Madame Makes Her Exit, directed by Wilhelm Thiele (German, 1931, based on the play L'Amoureuse Aventure) 
**Amourous Adventure, directed by Wilhelm Thiele (French, 1932, based on the play L'Amoureuse Aventure) 
, directed by Jean Choux (France, 1932, based on the play Un chien qui rapporte)
A Son from America, directed by Carmine Gallone (France, 1932, based on the play Un fils d'Amérique) 
Coiffeur pour dames, directed by René Guissart (France, 1932, based on the play Coiffeur pour dames)
Le Mari garçon, directed by Alberto Cavalcanti (France, 1933, based on the play Le Mari garçon)
, directed by Karl Anton (France, 1933, based on the operetta Un soir de réveillon)
School for Coquettes, directed by Pierre Colombier (France, 1935, based on the play School for Coquettes)
Die Entführung, directed by Géza von Bolváry (Germany, 1936, based on the play L'Enlèvement)
The Mysterious Mister X, directed by J. A. Hübler-Kahla (Germany, 1936, based on the play Dicky)
, directed by Robert Péguy (France, 1938, based on the play Dicky)
, directed by Raffaello Matarazzo (Italy, 1940, based on the play Dicky)
An Artist with Ladies, directed by Jean Boyer (France, 1952, based on the play Coiffeur pour dames)
School for Coquettes, directed by Jacqueline Audry (France, 1958, based on the play School for Coquettes)

References

Bibliography
 Pallister, Janis L. & Hottell, Ruth A. Francophone Women Film Directors: A Guide. Associated University Presses, 2005.

External links

1868 births
1933 deaths
French male screenwriters
20th-century French screenwriters
20th-century French dramatists and playwrights
French male dramatists and playwrights
Writers from Geneva
20th-century French male writers